Neil James Bibby (born 6 September 1983) is a Scottish Labour co-operative politician who has served as a Member of the Scottish Parliament (MSP) for the West Scotland region since 2011.

Early life and career 
Born in Paisley, Bibby grew up in Renfrewshire and went to the University of Glasgow. He had been Chair of Young Labour UK and Chair of Scottish Labour Students. In 2007 he was elected to Renfrewshire Council in the Johnstone North, Kilbarchan and Lochwinnoch ward. Before becoming elected to the Scottish Parliament he worked for Jim Murphy MP and Ken Macintosh MSP.

Member of the Scottish Parliament 
Bibby was elected to the Scottish Parliament at the 2011 election to represent the West Scotland region, as the Labour Party returned three members from its regional list. He did not contest the 2012 Renfrewshire Council election, with one of the seats in the ward won for Labour by his father Derek.

Bibby was previously the Scottish Labour Chief Whip and also served in the Shadow Cabinet as Shadow Minister for Education and Young People, Deputy Minister for Education and Shadow Minister for Transport and Town Centres.

Bibby has been a member of the Finance and Constitution Committee as well as a substitute member of the Delegated Powers and Law Reform Committee. Bibby is a member of a number of Cross-Party Groups and is the Deputy Convener of the Cross-Party Group on Visual Impairment, the Cross-Party Group on Towns and Town Centres and the Cross-Party Group on Scottish Horseracing and Bloodstock Industries.

Bibby stood for the Paisley seat in the 2016 Scottish Parliament election. He was defeated by the incumbent SNP MSP George Adam, but was re-elected on the West Scotland regional list.

Bibby nominated Anas Sarwar in the 2021 Scottish Labour leadership election.

References

External links
 

1983 births
Living people
Politicians from Paisley, Renfrewshire
Alumni of the University of Glasgow
Labour Co-operative MSPs
Members of the Scottish Parliament 2011–2016
Members of the Scottish Parliament 2016–2021
Members of the Scottish Parliament 2021–2026
Scottish Labour councillors
Councillors in Renfrewshire